Chang Jian (early part 8th century), and whose name, especially in older English transliteration, appears as "Ch'ang Chien", was a poet of the Tang Dynasty, and two of whose poems were collected in the popular anthology Three Hundred Tang Poems.

Biography
Chang Jian seems to be connected with the stratagem of "Tossing out a brick to get a jade gem" of the Thirty-Six Stratagems.

Poetry
Chang Jian is best known for his two poems which are included in the Three Hundred Tang Poems, translated by Witter Bynner as "At Wang Changling's Retreat" (a reference to the poet Wang Changling) and "A Buddhist Retreat Behind Broken-mountain Temple" .

Notes

References
Wu, John C. H. (1972). The Four Seasons of Tang Poetry. Rutland, Vermont: Charles E.Tuttle.

External links
 

Three Hundred Tang Poems poets
Year of death unknown
Writers from Xi'an
Year of birth unknown
8th-century Chinese poets
Poets from Shaanxi